Fragile Vastness is a Greek band, formed in February 2000 by Babis Tsolakis (drums, former member of Piranha and Retrospect), Vangelis Yalamas (bass guitar, former member of Airged Lahm and Retrospect), Evi Katsamatsa (piano/keyboards, a piano teacher), Alex Flouros (guitars, former member of Sound Of Silence) and Zacharias Tsoumos (vocals, tenor at the National Greek Opera).

History
Their musical influence covers a wide spectrum of different kinds of music, like jazz, Latin and ethnic music, but they can be categorized as a progressive rock/progressive metal band. After signing a contract with the record company Sleaszy Rider, they release their debut album called Excerpts..., including the video clip for the song “Weep No More”, on the November 19, 2002. In the beginning of 2004, Zacharias Tsoumos leaves the band due to obligations and is replaced by George Ikosipentakis. With this synthesis, their second album "A Tribute To Life" was released in 2005. Fragile Vastness has been a support band for bands like Sentenced, Pain of Salvation, Rage, Primordial, Deadsoul Tribe, Fates Warning and Helloween

Discography

Full albums
Excerpts... (2002)
A Tribute To Life (2005)
Perception (2017)

Participations
Don't Tribute Bad - The Songs of Firehouse (2004)
The Ultimate Collection (Upcoming release)

Music videos
Weep No More - Excerpts...(2002)
Somewhere - A Tribute To Life (2005)
’’Frequencies’’ - ‘’Perception’’ (2017)

Band members

Current members
Babis Tsolakis - Drums
Vangelis Yalamas - Bass Guitar
Evi Katsamatsa - Piano/Keyboards
George Thanasoglou- Guitar
Vasilis Batilas - Guitar
Elena Stratigopoulou - Vocals

Former members
Zacharias Tsoumos - Vocals (2000–2004)
Alex Flouros - guitars (2000-2011)
George Maroulis - guitars (2006–2007)
George Anyfantis - guitars
George Eikosipentakis - Vocals (2005 - 2012)

See also

Related genres
Progressive metal
Progressive rock
Ethnic
Latin
Jazz
Fusion

Related bands
Deadsoul Tribe
Dream Theater
Fates Warning
Pain of Salvation
Nine Inch Nails
Peter Gabriel
Gary Moore

External links
Official Website
Official Website of Sleaszy Rider Records
 Myspace Official Website
Vangelis Yalamas Myspace Official Website
Alex Flouros Myspace Official Website

Progressive metal musical groups
Greek heavy metal musical groups
Musical groups established in 2000